Petersburg is a city in Hale County, Texas, United States. As of the 2010 census, it had a population of 1,202.

History

Petersburg was founded in 1891 as a post office in southeast Hale County. It was named for Zack Peters and his wife, Margaret, who was the first postmistress. Although the townsite was platted in 1909, its population remained below 100 until the Fort Worth and Denver Railway was built through town in 1928. Wheat and grain sorghum (milo) were the main crops in the area until cotton was first planted in 1905.

The town was incorporated with a population of 200 in 1927. Petersburg grew as a farming and rail-shipment center, and by 1949, it had 22 businesses and 500 people. By 1980, its population had grown to 1,633; businesses included the Wylie Manufacturing Company, the Hughes Trucking Company, and a weekly newspaper, the Post. The population dropped to 1,262 according to the 2000 census.

Geography

Petersburg is located on the High Plains of the Llano Estacado at  (33.8695249, –101.5973877), in southeastern Hale County.

Demographics

2020 census

As of the 2020 United States census, there were 1,014 people, 397 households, and 272 families residing in the city.

2000 census
As of the census of 2000, 1,262 people, 428 households, and 342 families were residing in the city. The population density was 1,574.8 people/sq mi (609.1/km). The 498 housing units averaged 621.4/sq mi (240.3/km). The racial makeup of the city was 61.89% White, 2.14% African American, 1.66% Native American, 32.09% from other races, and 2.22% from two or more races. Hispanics or Latinos of any race were 61.09% of the population.

Of the 428 households, 39.7% had children under 18 living with them, 64.7% were married couples living together, 10.5% had a female householder with no husband present, and 19.9% were not families. About 19.4% of all households were made up of individuals, and 13.8% had someone living alone who was 65 or older. The average household size was 2.95, and the average family size was 3.36.

In the city, the age distribution was 31.7% under 18, 8.6% from 18 to 24, 25.7% from 25 to 44, 20.0% from 45 to 64, and 14.0% who were 65  or older. The median age was 33 years. For every 100 females, there were 96.6 males. For every 100 females age 18 and over, there were 87.4 males.

The median income for a household in the city was $30,263, and for a family was $33,047. Males had a median income of $24,511 versus $17,237 for females. The per capita income for the city was $13,531. About 14.5% of families and 19.6% of the population were below the poverty line, including 26.8% of those under age 18 and 17.3% of those age 65 or over.

Education
The city is served by the Petersburg Independent School District, and is home to the Petersburg High School Buffaloes.

Notable people

 John Richard Fowler (1927–2007), a member and president of the Texas State Board of Pharmacy and practicing pharmacist in Memphis, Texas, graduated from high school in Petersburg

See also
Barwise, Texas
Becton, Texas
Estacado, Texas

References

External links

Petersburg Independent School District

Cities in Hale County, Texas
Cities in Texas
1891 establishments in Texas